The 1988 Auburn Tigers football team represented Auburn University in the 1988 NCAA Division I-A football season.  Coached by Pat Dye, the team finished the season with a 10–2 record and won its second consecutive Southeastern Conference (SEC) title, sharing it with LSU.  LSU handed Auburn its only conference loss of the year 7–6, in a game referred to as the "Earthquake Game". Auburn lost to Florida State, 13–7, in the 1989 Sugar Bowl.

Schedule

Personnel

Rankings

Game summaries

Florida State (Sugar Bowl)

References

Auburn
Auburn Tigers football seasons
Southeastern Conference football champion seasons
Auburn Tigers football